The R411 is a Regional Route in South Africa. It runs from the N2 at Viedgesville south of Mthatha, east-south-east to Coffee Bay.

References

Regional Routes in the Eastern Cape